9th Airborne Division may refer to:
9th Indian Airborne Division, see 44th Airborne Division (India)
9th Airborne Division (United States), a military deception created in 1944